Joniston Bangkuai (born 17 April 1961) is a Malaysian politician who has served as the State Assistant Minister of Tourism, Culture and Environment of Sabah in the Gabungan Rakyat Sabah (GRS) state administration under Chief Minister Hajiji Noor and Ministers Jafry Ariffin and Christina Liew Chin Jin since October 2020 as well as Member of Sabah State Legislative Assembly (MLA) for Kiulu since May 2013. He is a member of the United Sabah Party (PBS), a component party of the GRS coalition. He has served as the Information Chief of PBS since July 2022 and Secretary-General of PBS from January 2021 to July 2022.

Honours
  :
  Commander of the Order of Kinabalu (PGDK) – Datuk (2006)

Election Results

References

Members of the Sabah State Legislative Assembly
Malaysian Christians
Kadazan-Dusun people
Malaysian Roman Catholics
Converts to Roman Catholicism from Adventism
United Sabah Party politicians
Living people
1961 births